Kalynivka is a town in Vinnytsia Oblast, Ukraine. Kalynivka serves as the administrative district of Kalynivka Raion, one of twenty-seven raions (districts) of Vinnytsia Oblast. The Population of Kalynivka is

History
The Jewish population was important in the town. During World War II, the Germans occupied the town and kept the Jews prisoners in a ghetto. In May 1942, hundreds of Jews were murdered in mass executions perpetrated by an Einsatzgruppe.

2017 munitions explosion

On 26 September 2017, at about 10:00 pm (19:00 UTC), the munitions depot for the Ukrainian Army, just south of the town, blew up causing extensive damage to nearby houses and other buildings. This was implied (if not claimed) to be Russian "sabotage" by Ukrainian authorities, including President Petro Poroshenko and Prime Minister Volodymyr Groysman. In September 2021 the general prosecutor announced that evidence confirmed sabotage.

Gallery

References

External links
 The murder of the Jews of Kalynivka during World War II, at Yad Vashem website.

Cities in Vinnytsia Oblast
Cities of district significance in Ukraine
Vinnitsky Uyezd
Shtetls
Jewish Ukrainian history
Holocaust locations in Ukraine